Betty Flippina Stöve (born 24 June 1945) is a Dutch former professional tennis player. She is best remembered for reaching the ladies' singles final, the ladies' doubles final and the mixed doubles final during the same year at Wimbledon in 1977. She also won ten Grand Slam titles in women's doubles and mixed doubles.

Career
Stöve began playing tennis internationally in the mid-1960s. She made her Grand Slam debut at the 1964 Wimbledon. A virus, complicated by a malfunctioning thyroid gland, forced Stöve out of tennis for an 18-month period in the late 1960s. Despite being advised that she should never play tennis again, Stöve recovered to have her best years on the circuit.

Stöve was an accomplished singles player reaching several finals on tour and attaining a singles ranking of number 5. Stöve's best grand slam singles performance was at the 1977 Wimbledon where she reached the final beating fellow doubles partner Martina Navratilova en route in the quarterfinals, and Sue Barker in the semi-finals preventing an all-England final. She lost the final to Virginia Wade: 4–6, 6–3, 6–1. Queen Elizabeth II attended the final. In addition she also reached the final of the women's doubles (with Navratilova) and the final of the mixed doubles with Frew McMillan, unfortunately losing them all. She is notably the last player in any Grand Slam event to earn such a record. Later that year Stöve was also a semifinalist at the 1977 US Open, losing to Chris Evert. This time she won the women's doubles with Navratilova and the mixed doubles with McMillan. In 1978 Stove reached the semi-finals or better at 9 of the singles events she contested reaching 5 finals but failing to win any of them. Notable players she beat in singles include Martina Navratilova, Sue Barker, Maria Bueno, Virginia Ruzici, Tracy Austin, Kerry Reid, Billie Jean King, and Claudia Kohde-Kilsch. One notable player she was never able to beat was Chris Evert whom she lost to all 10 times they played.

Stöve had her greatest success in doubles. She won 10 Grand Slam doubles championships, six in women's doubles and four in mixed doubles. She won two women's doubles championships with Billie Jean King and two with Wendy Turnbull. Her other two titles were won with Françoise Dürr and Martina Navratilova. All of her mixed doubles championships were with Frew McMillan. Stöve was the runner-up in 17 Grand Slam doubles tournaments, eight in women's doubles and nine in mixed doubles. She won a total of 75 doubles titles on tour and ranked World No. 1 in doubles.

She competed for the Netherlands Fed Cup team in 1966, 1969, 1970–1972, and 1976–1983.

Post-retirement activity
Stöve coached Hana Mandlíková from 1980 through 1990. She also coached Kristie Boogert.

Stöve is a former member of the ITF Committee of Management, its first female member.

She served three terms as president of WTA Tour Players Association and received the WTA Tour Honorary Membership Award in November 1987.

In 1989, Stöve and Mandlíková wrote Total Tennis, a tennis instruction book. Stöve speaks six languages and is an accomplished photographer.

Major finals

Grand Slam finals

Singles (1 runner-up)

Doubles: 14 (6 titles, 8 runner-ups)

Mixed doubles: 13 (4 titles, 9 runners-up)

Year-End Championships finals

Doubles: 3 (1 title, 2 runners-up)

Career finals

Singles (11)

(*) Note that Tokyo was a non-tour event in 1976, and some events listed above are before the inception of the WTA in June 1973.

Doubles (75)
Grand slam events in boldface.

1971: Monte Carlo (with Katja Ebbinghaus)
1971: Buenos Aires (with Olga Morozova)
1971: Dublin (with Lesley Turner Bowrey)
1971: Hilversum (with Christina Sandberg)
1972: French Open (with Billie Jean King)
1972: Wimbledon (with Billie Jean King)
1972: Newport (with Judy Tegart Dalton)
1972: US Open (with Françoise Dürr)
1973: Miami (with Françoise Dürr)
1973: Hilton Head Island (with Françoise Dürr)
1973: Nashville (with Françoise Dürr)
1973: Allaire (with Françoise Dürr)
1973: Newport (with Françoise Dürr)
1973: Columbus (with Françoise Dürr)
1974: Washington, D.C. (with Billie Jean King)
1974: Fort Lauderdale (with Françoise Dürr)
1974: St. Petersburg (with Olga Morozova)
1974: Orlando (with Françoise Dürr)
1974: Denver (with Françoise Dürr)
1974: Phoenix (with Françoise Dürr)
1975: Washington, D.C. (with Françoise Dürr)
1975: Akron (with Françoise Dürr)
1975: Houston (with Françoise Dürr)
1975: Dallas (with Françoise Dürr)
1975: Philadelphia (with Evonne Goolagong)
1975: Denver (with Françoise Dürr)
1975: Phoenix (with Françoise Dürr)
1975: Stockholm (with Françoise Dürr)
1975: Paris (with Françoise Dürr)
1975: London (with Françoise Dürr)
1976: Sarasota (with Martina Navratilova)
1976: San Francisco (with Billie Jean King)
1976: Philadelphia (with Billie Jean King)
1976: Phoenix (with Billie Jean King)
1976: London (with Virginia Wade)
1976: Sydney (with Martina Navratilova)
1976: Melbourne (with Margaret Court)
1977: Washington, D.C. (with Martina Navratilova)

1977: Hollywood (with Martina Navratilova)
1977: Houston (with Martina Navratilova)
1977: Detroit (with Martina Navratilova)
1977: Dallas (with Martina Navratilova)
1977: New York City, Virginia Slims Champ's (with Martina Navratilova)
1977: Tokyo, Bridgestone Doubles (with Martina Navratilova)
1977: Charlotte (with Martina Navratilova)
1977: US Open (with Martina Navratilova)
1977: Atlanta (with Martina Navratilova)
1977: Melbourne (with Evonne Goolagong)
1978: Los Angeles (with Virginia Wade)
1978: Chicago (with Evonne Goolagong)
1978: Eastbourne (with Chris Evert)
1978: Phoenix (with Tracy Austin)
1978: Brighton (with Virginia Wade)
1978: Filderstadt (with Tracy Austin)
1978: Tokyo, Gunze World (with Martina Navratilova)
1979: Hollywood (with Tracy Austin)
1979: Seattle (with Françoise Dürr)
1979: Detroit (with Wendy Turnbull)
1979: Philadelphia (with Françoise Dürr)
1979: New York City, Avon Champ's (with Françoise Dürr)
1979: Tokyo, Bridgestone Doubles (with Françoise Dürr)
1979: Rome (with Wendy Turnbull)
1979: French Open (with Wendy Turnbull)
1979: Eastbourne (with Wendy Turnbull)
1979: Richmond (with Wendy Turnbull)
1979: Mahwah (with Tracy Austin)
1979: US Open (with Wendy Turnbull)
1979: Atlanta (with Wendy Turnbull)
1979: Phoenix (with Wendy Turnbull)
1979: Stockholm (with Wendy Turnbull)
1980: Chichester (with Pam Shriver)
1980: Filderstadt (with Hana Mandlíková)
1980: Amsterdam (with Hana Mandlíková)
1980: Sydney (with Pam Shriver)
1980: Adelaide (with Pam Shriver)

Grand Slam singles tournament timeline 

Note: The Australian Open was held twice in 1977, in January and December.

See also 
 Performance timelines for all female tennis players who reached at least one Grand Slam final

References

External links 

 
 
 

1945 births
Living people
Dutch female tennis players
French Open champions
US Open (tennis) champions
Wimbledon champions
Grand Slam (tennis) champions in mixed doubles
Grand Slam (tennis) champions in women's doubles
Sportspeople from Rotterdam
People from Brasschaat